Menashe Masiah (born 2 November 1973 in Tel Aviv) is an Israeli football referee.

Masiah became a FIFA referee in 2009. He refereed in the 2012–13 UEFA Europa League and qualifying matches for Euro 2012.

See also
List of Jews in sports (non-players)

References 

1973 births
Living people
People from Tel Aviv
Israeli football referees
UEFA Europa League referees
Israeli people of Afghan-Jewish descent